It's a Wonderful Life ( Daai foo ji ga, literally House of Rich) is a 1994 Hong Kong comedy film directed by Clifton Ko, featuring an ensemble cast.

Cast
 Leslie Cheung as Roberto
 Tony Leung Ka-fai as Tam Kau-kwai
 Teresa Mo as Tam Kau-an
 Anita Yuen as Ho Sau-kit
 Raymond Wong Pak-ming as Tam Kau-fu
 Fung Bo Bo as Mrs. Tam Yuet-yung
 Carol Cheng as Miss 'Coffee' Ho
 Lau Ching-wan as Hou Chung
 Kwan Tak-hing as Grandpa Tam
 Lee Heung-kam as Mama Tam
 William Chu as Tam Kau-kei
 Cho Tat-wah as Tam Tai-foon
 James Wong as George
 Alexander Lee
 Chow Chi-fai as Judge
 Jameson Lam as Patron at Japanese restaurant
 Kan Shui-chiu as Chung's father
 Hui Fan as Chung's mother
 Poon An-ying as Yuet-yung's maid
 Wong Wa-wo as Yuet-ying's neighbor
 Chow Kong as Rascal on jetty
 Clifton Ko as Minibus passenger
 Ho Chi-kei
 Hui Si-man as Tam's family relative

See also
 List of Hong Kong films

External links
 
 loveHKfilm entry

1994 films
Hong Kong comedy films
1994 comedy films
1990s Cantonese-language films
Films set in Hong Kong
Films shot in Hong Kong
Films directed by Clifton Ko
1990s Hong Kong films